Ian Fray (born August 31, 2002) is an American soccer player who plays as a defender for MLS side Inter Miami.

Career

Fort Lauderdale CF
Fray made his league debut for the club on July 18, 2020, coming on as a 63rd-minute substitute for Modesto Méndez in a 2–0 defeat to the Greenville Triumph.

Inter Miami
On 26 January 2021, Fray signed as a homegrown player with Inter Miami. Fray suffered a torn ACL one month into his professional career.

International career

Fray is eligible for the US and Jamaica national teams. His sister, Marlee Fray, represents Jamaica internationally.

References

External links
Ian Fray at Inter Miami CF

2002 births
Living people
Inter Miami CF II players
Inter Miami CF players
USL League One players
American soccer players
Association football defenders
People from Coconut Creek, Florida
Soccer players from Florida
Homegrown Players (MLS)
Sportspeople from Broward County, Florida